Valaghuz (also Romanized as Valāghūz; also known as Lāghūz) is a village in Chaharkuh Rural District, in the Central District of Kordkuy County, Golestan Province, Iran. At the 2006 census, its population was 5,376, in 1,398 families.

References 

Populated places in Kordkuy County